Ichneutica olivea is a moth of the family Noctuidae.  It is endemic to New Zealand and is found in the central North Island down to the central South Island. It is very similar in appearance to I. lindsayorum but has a shorter basal streak and has white scaling from the subterminal line on the forewings that I. lindsayorum lacks This species prefers shrubland habitat. The life history of I. olivea is unknown as are the host species of its larvae. The adults are on the wing from December to March and are attracted to light.

Taxonomy 
This species was first described by Morris N. Watt in 1916 using a specimen he obtained in January at Mount Taranaki. Watt originally named the species Melanchra olivea. The holotype specimen used by Watt to describe the species has been lost. However the paratype series of specimens collected by Watt in 1916  are held at the Museum of New Zealand Te Papa Tongarewa. In 1988 J. S. Dugdale, in his catalogue of New Zealand Lepidoptera, placed this species within the Graphania genus. In 2019 Robert Hoare undertook a major review of New Zealand Noctuidae. During this review the genus Ichneutica was greatly expanded and the genus Graphania was subsumed into that genus as a synonym. As a result of this review, this species is now known as Ichneutica olivea.

Description 
Watt described the species as follows:
The adult males of this species have a wingspan of between 38 and 42 mm while the females have a wingspan of between 42 and 46 mm. It is very similar in appearance to I. lindsayorum but has a shorter basal streak and has  white scaling from the subterminal line on the forewings that I. lindsayorum lacks.

Distribution 
It is endemic to New Zealand. This species is found in the central North Island down to the central South Island.

Habitat 
This species prefers shrubland habitat.

Behaviour 
The adults are on the wing from December to March and are attracted to light.

Life history and host species 
The life history of this species is unknown as are the host species of its larvae.

References

Moths described in 1916
Hadeninae
Moths of New Zealand
Endemic fauna of New Zealand
Endemic moths of New Zealand